Real Hero is a Chinese variety show broadcast on JSBC: Jiangsu Television. It was first aired on 24 July 2015. This show is classified as a game-variety show, where at the start of each episode, one celebrity would be chosen by the producer to be the mole, whose main mission was to disrupt teamwork in his or her team and purposely throw challenges while keeping his or her identity a secret. After all the missions, the guests then voted on who they think is the mole and face punishment if voted correctly or not.

Cast

List of episodes and guests

First Season

List of guests 
The following is a compilation of guests and the number of time they have been on the show. They are listed in order of appearance.

Ratings

First Season

|-
|1/01
|
|0.759
|3.01
|6
|-
|1/02
|
|
|
|
|-
|1/03
|
|
|
|
|-
|1/04
|
|
|
|
|-
|1/05
|
|
|
|
|-
|1/06
|
|
|
|
|-
|1/07
|
|
|
|
|-
|1/08
|
|
|
|
|-
|1/09
|
|
|
|
|-
|1/10
|
|
|
|
|-
|1/11
|
|
|
|
|-
|1/12
|
|
|
|

References

External links
 Official Weibo 
 
 – Jiangsu Broadcasting Corporation (JSBC) 

2015 Chinese television seasons
Chinese variety television shows
2015 Chinese television series debuts
Jiangsu Television original programming
2015 Chinese television series endings